This page provides the summaries of the AFC fifth round matches for 2014 FIFA World Cup qualification.

Format
In the fifth round, the two third-placed teams from the fourth round competed in a two-legged play-off on 6 September and 10 September 2013. The winner advanced to the intercontinental play-offs against the fifth-placed team from CONMEBOL's World Cup qualifying tournament.

Qualified teams
Group A third place: 
Group B third place:

Matches
The draw for the fifth round of the AFC qualifiers was held in Zürich on 19 March 2013 during meetings of the Organising Committee for the FIFA World Cup.

|}

First leg

Second leg

2–2 on aggregate. Jordan won the penalty shoot-out 9–8 and advanced to the AFC v CONMEBOL play-off.

References

External links
Results and schedule (FIFA.com version)
Results and schedule (the-AFC.com version)

5
2013 in Asian football
2013
2013
2013 in Uzbekistani football
2013–14 in Jordanian football
September 2013 sports events in Asia